The Brewster Body Shield or Brewster Body Armor was the first effective body armor developed for the United States Army in World War I, designed by Dr. Guy Otis Brewster from Dover, New Jersey.

Reference in film 
An example of this armor appears in a scene of the 1970 Italian movie Many Wars Ago.

References

Further reading 
 Bashford Dean, Metropolitan Museum of Art, Helmets and body armor in modern warfare, Lightning Source Inc, 2008,

External links 
 Brewster Body Armor at Globalsecurity.org
 Brewster Body Armor at Uncertain Times
 Brewster Body Armor at 2pep

Body armor
World War I military equipment of the United States